Michel Fabrizio (born 17 September 1984) is a former professional motorcycle road racer. In 2021 he competed in the Supersport World Championship aboard a Kawasaki ZX-6R, before retiring on September 26 from motorsport as a sign of protest after Dean Berta Viñales' fatal crash in Jerez.

Career

Personal life and early career
Born in Frascati, near Rome, Fabrizio first raced in Minimoto at the age of 6, winning several titles before reaching his teens. He won the Aprilia Challenge in 2001, and raced in the 125 cc World Championship for Gilera in 2002, with little success.

He won the 2003 European Superstock championship aboard a Suzuki GSXR 1000.

MotoGP and World Supersport 
In 2004 he made his first appearance in MotoGP, with the Harris WCM team. Despite his lack of experience and riding with inferior equipment compared to his racing rivals, Fabrizio managed to impress the paddock with several point scoring finishes and by consistently outpacing his teammate, Chris Burns. His most notable result came in the wet at Jerez, where he scored 10th place despite a small crash during the race. Further points scoring finishes occurred in Italy and Germany.

During the Dutch grand prix at Assen, Fabrizio fractured his ankle in a spectacular crash, forcing him to miss the next round in Brazil. He was replaced by 2003 Harris WCM rider David De Gea. For the Portuguese round in Estoril, Fabrizio was presented with an opportunity to ride for Italian manufacturer Aprilia on the RS Cube. Regular rider Shane Byrne was suffering from a broken wrist, leading Aprilia to fly both Fabrizio and Anthony West out to Mugello to test the bike alongside Jeremy McWilliams. After impressing the team during the test, Fabrizio was selected to replace Byrne at Estoril. In turn, Fabrizio was replaced by British rider James Ellison for the race.

Realizing his dream of riding for a factory team ended up becoming an unravelling for Fabrizio, as he suffered a violent headshake from the much-maligned RS Cube during the first lap of the race. Despite continuing for 11 laps, the pain became too much and forced Fabrizio to retire from the race. Luckily, no serious injury was suffered, but this proved to not be the end of Fabrizio's problems during the year.

With expectations to return to the Harris WCM team for the next round at Motegi in Japan, he suddenly found himself without a ride, being replaced by 125cc rider Youichi Ui. With no options left, Fabrizio retired from the MotoGP season, finishing a disappointing 22nd.

To end his 2004 season, he took a ride with Team Italia Megabike in the Supersport World Championship, competing in the final two rounds of the series. In his first appearance, at his home track of Imola, Fabrizio took an impressive 7th place. At the series finale in France, he gained further notoriety after qualifying 2nd in only his second World Supersport appearance. He failed to finish the race, but had done enough to prove himself.

In 2005 he raced his first full season in the Supersport World Championship, on a factory Honda. He was 5th overall, with 9 top 5 results in the 12 races, although without a win.

Superbike World Championship
For  Fabrizio was teamed with the veteran Pierfrancesco Chili on privateer Honda machinery. He started his career with fifth and eighth at Qatar. He stood in for Toni Elías on MotoGP Fortuna Honda at Donington Park, but crashed in practice and broke his collarbone. He replaced the injured Elías again for the same team in the 2007 German Grand Prix at Sachsenring on July 15, 2007.

At Brno in the 2006 Superbike World Championship, he started tenth, but chose hard-compound tyres, which remained on the pace as other riders faded. In the first race he passed a fading Andrew Pitt as well as Fonsi Nieto, Troy Corser and Noriyuki Haga in the closing laps to score his first Superbike World Championship podium finish. In race two he fared even better - after passing James Toseland for fourth towards the end, he caught the battle for second between Haga and Corser. As Corser attempted a move, Fabrizio dived down the inside of both, slithering and nearly hitting Haga, before edging ahead of them both to the line, immediately improving on his career-best result with a second. His best results of 2007 were two third places, at Assen and Brno. In both seasons he was eleventh overall.

In  he raced alongside Troy Bayliss for Ducati Xerox Team on the new Ducati 1098. He came third in race one at Philip Island, Australia, despite a huge crash at the original start. At Miller Motorsports Park, he qualified on the front row and took a pair of third places, despite dropping to eleventh on lap one of the first race. He had a double-DNF at Assen, shortly before an arm operation, and finished a career-best 8th overall.

For 2009, he stays on at Ducati Xerox, partnering Noriyuki Haga after Bayliss' retirement. His first WSBK win (in his 94th start) came at Monza after Ben Spies ran out of fuel. Seven successive podiums followed, cementing his third place in the standings behind Haga and Spies. This run ended at Brno when he took Spies down as they battled for the lead. He finished the season third overall.

Fabrizio and Haga both continue with the team for 2010. The bike dominated pre-season testing at Phillip Island.

After Ducati announced that they would be ending support for their World Superbike operations at the end of the 2010 season, Fabrizio agreed a contract with Team Suzuki Alstare to race in the 2011 Superbike World Championship season.

MotoGP World Championship

In August 2009, after Casey Stoner announced his intention to withdraw from the next three Grand Prix, it was announced that his place in the Ducati Marlboro team would be taken by Mika Kallio whilst the Finn's place at Pramac Racing would be taken by Fabrizio. His race was marred by physical difficulties, which caused him to retire from the first race in Brno.  Fabrizio then being unavailable for the next race in Indianapolis the ride was given to Aleix Espargaró for the remaining two races.

Career statistics

Career summary

Grand Prix motorcycle racing

Races by year
(key) (Races in bold indicate pole position, races in italics indicate fastest lap)

Supersport World Championship

Races by year
(key) (Races in bold indicate pole position, races in italics indicate fastest lap)

Superbike World Championship

Races by year
(key) (Races in bold indicate pole position, races in italics indicate fastest lap)

References

External links

 

1984 births
Living people
People from Frascati
Italian motorcycle racers
Pramac Racing MotoGP riders
Superbike World Championship riders
125cc World Championship riders
Supersport World Championship riders
FIM Superstock 1000 Cup riders
Gresini Racing MotoGP riders
MotoGP World Championship riders
Sportspeople from the Metropolitan City of Rome Capital